Pelagophycus is a monotypic genus of kelp. It is found in deep waters off the west coast of central North America.

Three ecotypes are recognized: 
Pelagophycus giganteus 
Pelagophycus porra
Pelagophycus intermedius

References

Further reading
 

Laminariaceae
Flora of the Pacific
Marine biota of North America
Flora of California
Flora of Baja California
Flora of Baja California Sur
Flora of the West Coast of the United States
Natural history of the Channel Islands of California
Laminariales genera
Monotypic brown algae genera